Huauchinango is a municipality in the Mexican state of Puebla. The municipal seat is at Huauchinango.

References

Municipalities of Puebla